Paula Guerrero Sanz (born 20 September 1996) is a Spanish footballer who plays as a midfielder for Valencia.

Club career
Guerrero started her career at Levante B.

References

External links
Profile at La Liga

1996 births
Living people
Women's association football midfielders
Spanish women's footballers
Footballers from Valencia (city)
Levante UD Femenino players
Valencia CF Femenino players
Primera División (women) players
21st-century Spanish women